Robby Mills (born March 17, 1967) is an American politician who has served in the Kentucky Senate from the 4th district since 2019. He previously served in the Kentucky House of Representatives from the 11th district from 2017 to 2019.

References

1967 births
Living people
Republican Party members of the Kentucky House of Representatives
Republican Party Kentucky state senators
21st-century American politicians